During the 2010–11 season, Genoa C.F.C. competed in the Serie A, the top division of Italian football, and the Coppa Italia.

Fixtures

Players

Out on loan from previous season

Out on loan 2010–11

Transfers

In

Out

Out on loan

Co-ownership

Squad stats
As of 15 May

|}

Competitions

Serie A

Genoa C.F.C finished the season in tenth place on the league table, with 14 wins, 15 losses and 9 draws.

League table

Coppa Italia

References

2010-11
Italian football clubs 2010–11 season